Thomas Duve (born April 26, 1967) is a German jurist and historian. He is a law professor at Goethe University Frankfurt and director of the Max Planck Institute for Legal History and Legal Theory of the Max Planck Society since 2009.

Biography 
Duve studied law and philosophy at Heidelberg University, Pontifical Catholic University of Argentina, Ludwig Maximilian University of Munich and Munich School of Philosophy. He passed his Staatsexamen in 1994 and finished his doctoral thesis at the Ludwig Maximilian University of Munich, titled Normativität und Empirie im öffentlichen Recht und der Politikwissenschaft um 1900. Historisch-systematische Untersuchung des Lebens und Werks von Richard Schmidt (1862–1944) und der Methodenentwicklung seiner Zeit. His Doktorvater was the legal historian and canonist Peter Landau.

Duve habilitated in Munich in 2004/2005. He received veniae legendi for civil law, German legal history, historical comparative law, philosophy of law and canon law. The habilitation thesis Sonderrecht in der Frühen Neuzeit. Das frühneuzeitliche ius singulare, untersucht anhand der privilegia miserabilium personarum, senum und indorum in Alter und Neuer Welt  was published in 2008.

At the UCA in Buenos Aires, Duve was Professor of Legal History from 2005 to 2009. He has also been vice-director of the Institute for the History of Indian Canon Law since 2006 and associate professor of the Faculty of Canon Law at the UCA until 2009. That same year, he was appointed Director of the Max Planck Institute for European Legal History of the Max Planck Society in Frankfurt. Simultaneously he became a professor for Comparative Legal History at Goethe University Frankfurt.

He also served as the executive chair of the LOEWE focus on „Außergerichtliche und gerichtliche Konfliktlösung“ (Extrajudicial and Judicial Conflict Resolution), an interdisciplinary collaborative research project within the framework of the Hessian Excellence Programme, from 2012 to 2014.

Duve is among others a Member of the advisory board of Iuris Canonici Medii Aevi Consociatio (ICMAC) and of the Stephan-Kuttner-Institute of Medieval Canaon Law. He is also an academic Member of Academia Europaea, Max Planck Society, Akademie der Wissenschaften und der Literatur, National Academy of History of Argentina, Instituto de Investigaciones de Historia del Derecho and Instituto Internacional de Historia del Derecho Indiano.

Research 
Duve became director at the Max Planck Institute for European Legal History in 2009, taking over from Michael Stolleis. Until the end of 2021, he led the institute as executive director, which meant that he was also responsible for the entire institute. His successor as executive director was the newly appointed Marietta Auer, who joined the Institute in 2021. Under Duve, the name of the institute also changed to Max Planck Institute for Legal History and Theory, whereby the global perspective on legal history also became visible in the title.

His appointment as director of the Institute meant a complete reorientation of the research agenda, with the aim of placing European legal history in a broader context, both spatially and in terms of its subject matter. Research interests were expanded to include the territories and their encounters with the legal systems of Spain and Portugal since the early modern period. Duve thus permanently directed the investigations of European legal history towards a global perspective.

His focus is primarily on the legal history of the Iberian monarchies in the early modern period and the global historical perspective on European legal history. He is also interested in the history of ecclesiastical law and moral theology, especially the Salamanca School, as well as the methods of legal history.

References 

Living people

1967 births
German jurists
Academic staff of Goethe University Frankfurt
Heidelberg University alumni
Pontifical Catholic University of Argentina alumni
Ludwig Maximilian University of Munich alumni
Members of Academia Europaea
Max Planck Institute directors